The 1993–94 Irish League Cup (known as the Wilkinson Sword League Cup for sponsorship reasons) was the eighth edition of Northern Ireland's secondary football knock-out cup competition. It concluded on 26 April 1994 with the final.

Bangor were the defending champions after winning the League Cup for the first, and to date, only time by defeating Coleraine 3–0 in the previous final. This season they went out in the second round to Ards. Linfield were the eventual winners, lifting the cup for the third time with a 2–0 victory over Coleraine in the final. Coleraine became runners-up for the second successive season.

First round

|}

Second round

|}

Quarter-finals

|}

Semi-finals

|}

Final

References

Lea
1993–94 domestic association football cups
1993–94